Ironmacannie Mill is a historic watermill near Balmaclellan in Dumfries and Galloway, Scotland. Built in the 18th and 19th centuries, on the site of an older mill, it retains a substantial amount of original gearing and machinery, and was designated a Category A listed building in 1971. It was converted for domestic use in the 1990s, and is currently used as holiday accommodation.

Description

It is a three-story L-plan building, with rubble masonry made of locally mined whinstone. The windows are plain, and mostly in the south-east wall. The larger wheel formerly drove the mill's three grinding stones, while the smaller one operated the bellows for the mill's kiln. There is now a micro hydro generator, providing power for the building.

History
Most of the surviving structure dates to the nineteenth century, but the oldest parts of the building are late eighteenth-century, and it was built on the site of a much older mill. It was designated a Category A listed building in 1971; its designation describes it as being "remarkable for the survival of most of the internal gearing and machinery". In 1990, consent was granted to convert the building for use as domestic accommodation, while preserving the historic gear and machinery in-situ; work began shortly afterwards, and the building is currently used as holiday accommodation, marketed as The Hidden Mill.

References

Sources

External links 
The Hidden Mill

Category A listed buildings in Dumfries and Galloway
Watermills in Scotland